Gore Mountain may refer to:

 Gore Mountain (New York)
 Gore Mountain (ski resort), New York
 Gore Mountain (Vermont)